Two (stylized as II) is the second studio album by American alternative rock band the Calling, released on June 8, 2004 (vocalist Alex Band's 23rd birthday) through RCA Records. The record only features original members Band and guitarist Aaron Kamin along with a variety of session musicians.

The album deals with romantic love and relationships.

Despite radio-friendly singles and relentless touring by the band, the album was viewed by many as under-promoted by the label and a commercial disappointment compared to the success of their first album.

Reception

"Our Lives" was a minor hit, but the album was not as successful as their debut album Camino Palmero with sales totaling two million worldwide. Johnny Loftus at AllMusic, who gave it one and half out of five stars, said the album is "never adding enough of anything to be memorable or personal", and, that it is "the alternative to having an opinion."

Two didn't do as well in the charts as their debut album, as it only peaked at No. 54 on Billboard 200. In UK it peaked higher than their first album as it reached No. 9. Worldwide sales of the album reach 1,500,000.

Track listing
All songs written and composed by Alex Band and Aaron Kamin.

Personnel 
 Alex Band – arranger, keyboards, programming, vocals, producer
 Paul Bushell – bass
 The Calling – video producer
 Bob Clearmountain – mixing
 Clive Davis – executive producer
 Stephen Ferrera – A&R
 Shaina Fewell – video director
 FJH – art direction
 Josh Freese – drums
 Marc Greene – engineer
 Tal Hertzberg – engineer
 Kurt Iswarienko – photography
 Aaron Kamin – bass, percussion, piano, strings, arranger, programming, producer, engineer, spoken word, group member
 Chris Lord-Alge – mixing
 Clif Magness – producer
 Jamie Muhoberac – piano, strings
 Gary Novak – drums
 Alan Steinberger – keyboards, Hammond organ
 Marc Tanner – producer
 Matthew Welch – photography
 Joe Yannece – mastering

Charts

Certifications

References

2004 albums
RCA Records albums
The Calling albums